Scarecrow is the eighth studio album by John Mellencamp. Released in August 1985, it peaked at number two on the US chart. The remastered version was released May 24, 2005 on Mercury/Island/UMe and includes one bonus track. On November 4, 2022, a "deluxe" two-CD remastered and remixed version of the album was released.

This album contained three top-ten hits, a record for a Mellencamp album: "R.O.C.K. in the U.S.A.", which peaked at number two in the US; "Lonely Ol' Night", which peaked at number six; and "Small Town", which also peaked at number six. "Lonely Ol' Night" also peaked at number one on the Mainstream Rock Tracks chart, his second chart-topping single on this chart.

In 1989, Rolling Stone magazine ranked Scarecrow number 95 on its list of the 100 greatest albums of the 1980s, saying: "Scarecrow consolidated the band's rugged, roots-rock thrash and the ongoing maturation of Mellencamp's lyrics."

Background
Rolling Stone also reported that the band spent a month in rehearsals, playing a hundred rock and roll songs from the 1960s before going into the studio. According to the record's producer, Don Gehman, the idea was to "learn all these devices from the past and use them in a new way with John's arrangements." The album was recorded at Mellencamp's own "Belmont Mall" studio in Belmont, Indiana.

The overall theme of the album is the fading of the American dream in the face of corporate greed. Rolling Stone wrote that songs such as "Face of the Nation", "Minutes to Memories" and "Small Town" have a "bittersweet, reflective tone".

In his 2016 Rock and Roll Hall of Fame exhibit, Mellencamp said:  "With Scarecrow, I was finally starting to find my feet as a songwriter. Finally, for the first time, I realized what I thought I wanted to say in song. ...I wanted it to be more akin to Tennessee Williams, John Steinbeck, Faulkner, as opposed to The Rolling Stones or Bob Dylan."

Songs
"I wrote a song called 'Stand for Something'," Mellencamp explained to Creem magazine in late 1985, "but I never did say what you should stand for – except your own truth. That song was supposed to be funny, too, and I hope people got that. But I think that's the key to the whole LP – suggesting that each person come to grips with their own individual truth – and try to like themselves a little bit more. Find out what you as a person are – and don't let the world drag you down. People should have respect for and believe in themselves."

Mellencamp told Creem that he was "kinda disappointed" in "R.O.C.K. (In The U.S.A.)" and "Justice and Independence '85", saying: "I don't think people are getting the idea of what the song's about, so I must've not done a very good job."

Cash Box said of the single "Rain on the Scarecrow" that it's "solid, riveting rock and roll from an American treasure" and represents an "impassioned plea on behalf of America’s small farmers."  Billboard said it consists of "raw rage and bleak visions of a disintegrating way of life."

Cash Box said of the single "Rumbleseat" that "the distinctive, rocking style of Mellencamp is put to great effect."  Billboard said that it's "stripped down rockabilly with a moral to it."

The 2005 remaster of the album adds an additional track: an acoustic version of "Small Town" that one reviewer calls the album's "best moment". On November 4, 2022, a remastered and remixed deluxe box set of the album on CD includes all of the 13 tracks of the 2005 remaster as its first disc.  A second disc of b-sides, demos and alternative versions, some previously unreleased, is also included.  

A simultaneous release of these songs was also made in 24bit-96kHz high-resolution audio.  The album was also released on one LP with the 11 tracks of the original LP plus "The Kind of Fella I Am". New liner notes by music critic Anthony DeCurtis accompany the physical releases. Two outtakes from the Scarecrow sessions, "Carolina Shag" and "Smart Guys", were released for the first time on the deluxe box set.

Track listing
All songs written by John Mellencamp, except where noted.

Original release

Re-releases

Personnel
John Mellencamp – vocals, guitar, harmonica on "Small Town"
Larry Crane – electric guitars, acoustic guitars, backing vocals
Kenny Aronoff – drums, tambourine, vibes, backing vocals
Mike Wanchic – electric guitars, backing vocals
Toby Myers – electric bass, backing vocals
John Cascella – keyboards
Rickie Lee Jones – vocals on "Between a Laugh and a Tear"
Sarah Flint – background vocals on "R.O.C.K. in the U.S.A."
Laura Mellencamp (John Mellencamp's grandmother) – lead vocal on "Grandma's Theme"
Mimi Mapes – backing vocals on "Minutes to Memories"
A. Jack Wilkins – saxophone on "Justice and Independence '85"
Richard Fanning – trumpet on "Justice and Independence '85"
Ry Cooder – slide guitar on "The Kind of Fella I Am"

Charts

Weekly charts

Certifications

Notes

References 

1985 albums
John Mellencamp albums
Albums produced by Don Gehman
Riva Records albums